Albe is a frazione of Massa d'Albe, in the Province of L'Aquila, in the Abruzzo, region of Italy.

Frazioni of the Province of L'Aquila
Massa d'Albe